Susan Bonner (born 1963) is a Canadian radio and television journalist, currently the lead anchor of CBC Radio One's The World at Six.

Originally from Montreal, Quebec, Bonner studied journalism at Ryerson University. She joined the Canadian Broadcasting Corporation in 1985 as an intern, and worked for the CBC's stations in Saskatoon, Calgary, Halifax and Montreal before joining the national news division as a political correspondent in Ottawa.

From 2009 to 2013, she was posted to the network's Washington, D.C. bureau. She succeeded Alison Smith as anchor of The World at Six in September 2014.

References

1963 births
Canadian radio news anchors
Canadian radio reporters and correspondents
Canadian television reporters and correspondents
CBC Radio hosts
Journalists from Montreal
Anglophone Quebec people
Living people
Toronto Metropolitan University alumni
20th-century Canadian journalists
21st-century Canadian journalists
Canadian women television journalists
Canadian women radio journalists
20th-century Canadian women
Canadian women radio hosts